Gift Lake Metis Settlement is a Metis settlement in northern Alberta, Canada within Big Lakes County.

Demographics 

The population of the Gift Lake Metis Settlement according to its 2018 municipal census is 812, an increase from its 2015 municipal census population count of 651.

See also 
List of communities in Alberta
List of designated places in Alberta

References 

Big Lakes County
Métis settlements in Alberta
Designated places in Alberta